Jackson Paul Grant (born October 16, 2002) is an American college basketball player for the Washington Huskies of the Pac-12 Conference.

High school career
Grant played basketball for Olympia High School in Olympia, Washington. He stood 6 ft 9 in (2.06 m) as a 16-year-old sophomore. In his junior season, he averaged 17 points and 11 rebounds per game, leading his team to fourth place at the Class 4A state tournament, and was named All-Area Player of the Year. As a senior, Grant averaged 22.9 points, 11.2 rebounds and three blocks per game, earning Washington Gatorade Player of the Year, McDonald's All-American, and Nike Hoop Summit accolades. He repeated as All-Area Player of the Year and left as Olympia's all-time leading scorer.

Recruiting
A consensus four-star recruit, Grant committed to playing college basketball for Washington over offers from California, Oklahoma, Stanford and Wisconsin.

Career statistics

College

|-
| style="text-align:left;"| 2021–22
| style="text-align:left;"| Washington
| 25 || 0 || 6.5 || .375 || .000 || .563 || 1.5 || .1 || .2 || .3 || 1.1

References

External links
Washington Huskies bio
USA Basketball bio

2002 births
Living people
American men's basketball players
Basketball players from Washington (state)
Centers (basketball)
McDonald's High School All-Americans
Power forwards (basketball)
Sportspeople from Olympia, Washington
Washington Huskies men's basketball players